Saralegui, officially Saralegi and Zaralegui in Basque, is a Basque surname and may refer to:

Arcadio Larraona Saralegui, Spanish cardinal
Cristina Saralegui, Cuban-American journalist and actress
Marcelo Saralegui, Uruguayan footballer
Mario Saralegui, Uruguayan footballer and manager
 Adolfo Zaralegui, Marquis, opera singer,
Carlos Hipólito Saralegui Lesca (better known as Charles Lescat), Argentine activist

References

Basque-language surnames